Intervention is a 1968 Russian adventure film directed by Gennadi Poloka. The film was banned in the Soviet Union for nearly 20 years and was released only in 1987.

Cast 
 Vladimir Vysotsky as Michel Voronov / Brodsky
 Valeri Zolotukhin as Zhenka Xidias, student of Odessa University
 Olga Aroseva as Banker Xidias, Zhenka's mother, rich widow
 Gelena Ivlieva as Sanyka alias Fyokla, flower-girl, Bolshevik 
 Yefim Kopelyan as Philipp, main thief of Odessa
 Rufina Nifontova as Madame Tokarchuk, Mokrushnitsa (criminal jargon — female homicide)
 Vladimir Tatosov as Imertsaki, card-sharper	
 Marlen Khutsiev as Philippe Henri Joseph d'Anselme
 Georgy Shtil as Martial, french soldier
 Boris Leskin as businessman

References

External links 

1960s adventure films
Soviet adventure films
Lenfilm films
Soviet films based on plays